Emil André Ulsletten (born 16 May 1993) is a Norwegian snowboarder. He was born in Lillehammer. He competed in slopestyle at the 2014 Winter Olympics in Sochi.

References

External links

1993 births
Living people
Sportspeople from Lillehammer
Snowboarders at the 2014 Winter Olympics
Norwegian male snowboarders
Olympic snowboarders of Norway
21st-century Norwegian people